Punto y raya is a 2004 Venezuelan film directed by Elia Schneider. It was Venezuela's submission to the 77th Academy Awards for the Academy Award for Best Foreign Language Film, but failed to receive a nomination.

See also

List of submissions to the 77th Academy Awards for Best Foreign Language Film

References

External links

2004 films
2004 comedy films
2000s Spanish-language films
Venezuelan comedy films
Political satire films
Spanish Sign Language films